Wild Cherry is the first studio album by Wild Cherry, released in 1976. The album includes the group's only major single success, "Play That Funky Music".

Track listing
All songs written by Rob Parissi except where noted. 
 "Play That Funky Music" – 5:00
 "The Lady Wants Your Money" – 4:13
 "99½" (Steve Cropper, Eddie Floyd, Wilson Pickett) – 3:00
 "Don't Go Near the Water" – 3:16
 "Nowhere to Run" (Holland–Dozier–Holland) – 3:05
 "I Feel Sanctified" (The Commodores) – 3:53
 "Hold On" – 4:12
 "Get It Up" – 2:59
 "What in the Funk Do You See" – 3:26

Personnel

Wild Cherry
Robert Parissi – guitars, lead vocals
Bryan Bassett – guitars, backing vocals
Allen Wentz – bass, backing vocals, synthesizers
Ronald Beitle – drums, backing vocals, percussion

Additional personnel
Chuck Berginc, Jack Brndiar, Joe Eckert, Rick Singer – horns (tracks 1, 3, 6)
Becky Goldstein, Tampa Lann – backing vocals (tracks 2, 7, 8)
Mark Avsec – synthesizer (tracks 2, 5, 8, 9), piano (track 5)
Gerald Paluck – vibes (track 7)

Production
Executive producer: Carl Maduri
Arranged by Wild Cherry
Produced by Robert Parissi for Belkin/Maduri Productions
Recorded by Ken Hamann
Mixed by Carl Maduri, Robert Parissi and Ken Hamann

Charts

Certifications

See also
List of number-one R&B albums of 1976 (U.S.)

References

1976 debut albums
Wild Cherry (band) albums
Epic Records albums